Bárbara da Silva Sequeira (born 15 March 1996) is a Portuguese female acrobatic gymnast. With partners Iris Mendes and Jessica Correia, Silva Sequeira achieved 8th in the 2014 Acrobatic Gymnastics World Championships.

References

External links
 

1996 births
Living people
Portuguese acrobatic gymnasts
Female acrobatic gymnasts
European Games medalists in gymnastics
European Games silver medalists for Portugal
European Games bronze medalists for Portugal
Gymnasts at the 2019 European Games
Place of birth missing (living people)
20th-century Portuguese women
21st-century Portuguese women